Cărpineni is a commune in Hîncești District, Moldova. It is composed of two villages, Cărpineni and Horjești.

Notable people
 Vitalie Călugăreanu
 Ivan Ionaș

References

Communes of Hîncești District